The mir-BART1 microRNA precursor is found in Human herpesvirus 4 (Epstein–Barr virus) and Cercopithicine herpesvirus 15. mir-BART1 is found in all stages of infection but expression is significantly elevated in the lytic stage. In Epstein-Barr virus, mir-BART1 is found in the intronic regions of the BART (Bam HI-A region rightward transcript) gene whose function is unknown. The mature sequence is excised from the 5' arm of the hairpin.

References

External links 
 

MicroRNA
MicroRNA precursor families